China National Highway 319 (G319) runs northwest from Xiamen, Fujian towards Jiangxi Province, Hunan Province, Chongqing, and ends in Chengdu, Sichuan. It is 2984 kilometres in length.

Route and distance

See also 

 China National Highways

Transport in Fujian
Transport in Jiangxi
Transport in Hunan
Transport in Chongqing
Transport in Sichuan
319